Oliver Burton (27 May 1879 – 20 January 1929) was an English professional footballer who played for Tottenham Hotspur.

Football career 
Burton, a left back, played a total of 133 matches for Tottenham Hotspur in all competitions between 1904–09.

References 

1879 births
1929 deaths
Footballers from Derby
English footballers
English Football League players
Tottenham Hotspur F.C. players
Association football fullbacks